Noragavit or Noragavit’, is a neighbourhood within the Shengavit District of Yerevan, Armenia.

References 

Populated places in Yerevan